Naval Base Durban in Durban harbour is a naval base of the South African Navy, situated on Salisbury Island, which is now joined to the mainland through land reclamation. It was formerly a full naval base until it was downgraded to a naval station in 2002. With the reduction in naval activities much of the island was taken over by the Army as a general support base, but they left after a few years resulting in the abandoned section becoming derelict. In 2012 a decision was made to renovate and expand the facilities back up to a full naval base to accommodate the South African Navy's offshore patrol flotilla. In December 2015 it was officially redesignated Naval Base Durban.

When the new offshore and inshore patrol vessels enter service they will replace the Warrior-class vessels.

History

Second World War
The entry of Japan into the Second World War on the side of the Axis Powers and their ability to threaten the east coast of Africa prompted the construction of a new naval base on Salisbury Island. In the process of this construction the island was linked to the mainland by a causeway and the level of the land was raised three metres. Besides wharves the base facilities included barracks, workshops, a hospital as well as training facilities. A floating dry dock and crane were also installed. The construction was however only completed after the war had ended.

References

Installations of the South African Navy